Torsten Karl Viktor Nothin (13 February 1884 – 1 March 1972) was a Swedish official and social democratic politician. He was Minister for Justice from 1924 to 1926 and Governor of Stockholm from 1933 to 1949.

Early life
Nothin was born on 13 February 1884 in Voxtorp Parish, Jönköping County, Sweden, the son of Johannes Nothin, a vicar, and his wife Anna Bengtson. He completed his civil service degree in law (hovrättsexamen) in 1905.

Career
Nothin was acting legal clerk (hovrättsfiskal) in 1910, a co-opted member of the Hovrätt in 1911, acting audit secretary in 1915, legal clerk in 1914, and hovrättsråd in 1917. He then served as Director of Legal matters in the Ministry of Finance in 1918 and as audit secretary in 1920. Nothing was minister without portfolio from 10 March to 27 October 1920 and from 13 October 1921 to 19 April 1923. He then served as acting Director General of the National Swedish Land Survey Board from 1923 to 1924. Nothin was a member of the Första kammaren from 1921 to 1928, and served as Minister for Justice from 18 October 1924 to 7 June 1926. He was appointed Director General of the National Swedish Land Survey Board in 1926, and served as minister without portfolio from 24 September 1932 to 16 September 1933. Nothin was Governor of Stockholm from 1933 to 1949.

Nothin was chairman of about 20 committees and expert investigations, including the Committee on the Hovrätterna (Kommittén angående hovrätterna) in 1926, Dalautredningen from 1930 to 1932, Statens organisationsnämnd ("National Organization Board") until 1932, Aviation Investigation of 1934 (1934 års luftfartsutredning), the "Mother Investigation" of 1935 (1935 års "mammututredning") and the Municipal Tax Preparation of 1936 (1936 års kommunalskatteberedning), and various negotiating delegations between the Crown and the City of Stockholm. He was also the state's board member in Grängesbergsbolaget and in LKAB from 1923 to 1955.

Nothin was the initiator of, among other things the National Society for Road Safety, Society and Defence and Riksluftskyddsförbundet ("National Aerial-Protection Association"). He was chairman of the AB Papyrus, Saab AB, Rederi AB Nordstjernan, and vice chairman of the Thule Group. Nothin was initiator of and one of the publishers of Svensk lagsamling (1950–1954). Nothin was also chairman of a number of foundations and associations, including the Swedish Gymnastic Association (Svenska gymnastikförbundet) until 1936, the Swedish Flag Day, the Swedish Tourist Traffic Association (Svenska turisttrafikförbundet), the Stockholm Shooting Federation (Stockholms skytteförbund) (until 1944), the Stockholm Choral Society (Stockholms sångarförbund), and the Nordic Society.

Prince Lennart Bernadotte reported that Nothin was very powerful and in private, in the 1940s, approached him with homosexual advances, knowing how to subject men who rejected him to intrigue and revenge.

Personal life
In 1925, he married Vera Åkerman (1900–1955), the daughter of the District Judge Assar Åkerman and Othilda Borg. They had one child: Margareta (born 1927).

Awards and decorations
   Knight and Commander of the Orders of His Majesty (30 September 1949)
   King Gustaf V's Jubilee Commemorative Medal (1948)
   H. M. The King's Medal

Honours
Member of the Royal Swedish Academy of Agriculture and Forestry (1930)
Honorary Doctors of the Faculty of Law, Uppsala University (1932)

References

External links

Article at Svenskt biografiskt lexikon 
 

|-

|-

|-

1884 births
1972 deaths
Swedish jurists
Swedish Ministers for Justice
Swedish Social Democratic Party MEPs
Members of the Första kammaren
County governors of Sweden
People from Värnamo Municipality
Members of the Royal Swedish Academy of Agriculture and Forestry
Lund University alumni